24Kitchen is a Portuguese pay television channel that features programs about food and cooking. It is owned by The Walt Disney Company.

The Portuguese 24Kitchen is modeled out of the Dutch version. It has original Portuguese productions with Portuguese cuisine and local chefs, including Ljubomir Stanisic and Rodrigo Meneses, who were contestants in the Portuguese version of MasterChef. Filipa Gomes with her 1950s rockabilly and pin-up style presents the daily show, Prato do Dia. The remaining is imported programming related to international cuisine.

In 2022, a select amount of original programming from the channel has become available on Disney+'s Star hub across multiple countries.

References

Portuguese-language television stations
Television channels and stations established in 2001
Television stations in Portugal
Disney television networks